The Albion Park-Oak Flats Eagles are an Australian rugby league football team based in Albion Park, a country town of the Illawarra region. The club are a part of Country Rugby League and have competed in both the Illawarra and South Coast competitions, where it competes today. The club's greatest achievement to date is winning the Clayton Cup in 2007.

History
Originally the team was known as Albion Park until 1964, before the team expanded to Oak Flats thus changing their name to Albion Park-Oak Flats. The team won two premierships before this time, the first in 1944 and the second in 1949. The Eagles were originally members of South Coast Rugby League before switching to the Illawarra District League in the 1920s where the remained until its return to the South Coast in 1933.

After a slow start to the 20th century, they finished off with a bang winning the 1998 and 1999 First Grade Premierships. They brought this strength into the 21st century winning a third consecutive premiership in 2000. They remained one of the strongest team in the South Coast throughout the 2000s, appearing in six grand finals and winning the Clayton Cup in 2007.

Name and Emblem
The Eagles logo is adapted from that of NRL and NSWRL side Manly-Warringah Sea Eagles.

Colours
The team's colours are Maroon and White, again similar to that of the Manly Sea Eagles

Notable Juniors
Jason Hooper (1997-07 Illawarra Steelers, St George Illawarra Dragons & St. Helens)
Aaron Gorrell (2002-09 St George Illawarra Dragons, Catalans Dragons & Brisbane Broncos)
Joe Vickery (2013- Leeds Rhinos & Wakefield Trinity Wildcats)
Drew Hutchison (2015- St George Illawarra Dragons)
Benny Warner (2008-Cootamundra Bulldogs, Yenda Blue Heelers, Wagga Wagga Brothers, Yass Magpies & Tumut Blues)
Adam Clune (2020- St George Illawarra Dragons)
Lachlan Murphy 2017- current
Dylan Lucas (2023- Newcastle Knights)

Current accolades include 
- committee member of the year 
- 3 time team man of the year
- 2 time Halfback of the year
- 2 time front rower of the year 
- most tries scored in a year (37)
- most points scored in a year (346)

Honours

Team
 Group 7 Rugby League Premierships: 13
 1944, 1949, 1963, 1964, 1975, 1998, 1999, 2000, 2003, 2006, 2007, 2009, 2012
 First Grade Minor Premierships: 10
 1963, 1976, 1999, 2000, 2003, 2005, 2006, 2007, 2010, 2012
 Second Grade Premierships: 8
 1938*, 1966, 1976, 1997, 1998, 1999, 2008, 2019
 U-18's Premierships: 8
 1954, 1966, 1978, 1984, 1990, 1999, 2012, 2018
 Leo O'Dwyer Cups: 4
 1963, 1968, 1969, 1975, 2000
 Third Grade Premierships (Regan Cup): 4
 1974, 1981, 1985, 1991
 Club Championships: 7
 1975, 1984, 1985, 1997, 1998, 2006, 2007
 Clayton Cup: 1
 2007

Individuals
 Group 7 Player of the Year (5)
John Marley (1969), Jade Lucas (2000), Simon Pimanovs (2005 & 2007), Derek "Spud" Gray (2008)
 Highest Point-scorer of the Year (2)
David Jensen (2000), Sean Jenkins (2007)
 Highest Try-scorer of the Year (6)
Ralph Clarke (1987), Cole Skelly (1995), Mick Gillespie (1999), Simon Pimanovs (2000 & 2007), Sean Jenkins (2007), Danny Sartori (2009)
 Rookie of the Year (2)
Craig Nicholls (1993), Sean Jenkins (2001)
 Kevin Walsh Scholarship (1)
Jacob Boon (2006)
 Under-18s Player of the Year (2)
Cole Skelly (1989), Ian Jones (1990)
 Under-21s Player of the Year (2)
Cole Skelly (1990), Ian Jones (1991)

References

External links
 Albion Park-Oak Flats Homepage
 Country Rugby League Homepage
 Country Rugby League
 South Coast Rugby League Homepage

Rugby clubs established in 1914
1914 establishments in Australia
Rugby league teams in Wollongong
South Coast (New South Wales)